The Root River flows for  through the Driftless Area of southeastern Minnesota and is a tributary of the Upper Mississippi River. The Root River is formed by three branches, the North, South and Middle branches of the Root River and the South Fork Root River.  It is an excellent river for canoeing and fishing. The gentle to moderate flowing river drops an average of 3.4 ft/mile from Chatfield, Minnesota, to its pour point in the Mississippi River into Navigation Pool 7 just south of La Crosse, Wisconsin and east of Hokah, Minnesota.

History and description
Root River is an English translation of the Dakota-language name Hokah.

The Root River is formed by the merger of its North Branch Root River and Middle Fork Root River in Chatfield, Minnesota.   A mile and a half north of Lanesboro, Minnesota it is joined by the South Branch Root River.  The South Fork Root River joins the Root River near Houston, Minnesota.  

The South Branch Root River rises in Mower County as agricultural drainage ditches, which disappear underground, re-emerging as a much cooler stream at Mystery Cave near Preston, Minnesota. The 48°F water creates superb conditions for brook trout.  

The Root River and its tributaries lie within Minnesota's Driftless Area, a region which missed being glaciated during the last ice age, i.e., the Wisconsinian glaciation.

At Houston, the Root River's discharge was 845.2 cubic feet per second in 1961.

Fish and wildlife
Many fish species such as brook trout, rainbow trout, brown trout, smallmouth bass, rock bass, channel catfish,  crappies, shorthead redhorse, river redhorse, golden redhorse, silver redhorse, Longnose Sturgeon, greater redhorse, black redhorse, northern hogsuckers, and white suckers inhabit the river. The Root River system provides habitat to a number of bird species. Red-tailed hawks and bald eagles can be found in the area. Blue herons, wild turkeys, and wood ducks are also commonly seen. Numerous mammals can be spotted in the region including deer, gray fox, red fox, coyotes, raccoons, squirrels, and badgers.

Trail
The Root River State Trail is a  trail for bicycling, hiking, skating, skiing, etc. It begins in Fountain and continues through Lanesboro, Whalan, Peterson, Rushford, and Houston.

2007 flood

Maps

See also

List of Minnesota rivers
List of longest streams of Minnesota

References

External links
Minnesota DNR canoeing guide for the Root River
Minnesota DNR trail guide for the Root River State Trail.

Rivers of Minnesota
Tributaries of the Mississippi River
Driftless Area
Rivers of Mower County, Minnesota
Rivers of Houston County, Minnesota
Southern Minnesota trout streams